T. Mariotti S.p.A. is an Italian shipbuilder based in Genoa, Italy. The company specializes in building small cruise ship - mainly focused on the luxury market, superyachts and offshore vessels. The company also does refits of ships and yachts. T. Mariotti employs roughly 1,000 people.

History 
The company was founded in 1928 as a ship repair company by Temistocle Mariotti. In the 1950s the company began to focus on ship conversions. The company entered the cruise ship market in the 1990s. Here it mostly focuses on the ultra luxury cruise ship segment, building ships that are smaller but more luxurious than many of its competitors. The company claims that its ships are built to the highest environmental regulatory standards.

In the 2000s entered the superyacht market, via its brand Mariotti Yachts.

In 2007 T. Mariotti entered into a joint venture with Italian steel manufacturer Cimolai S.p.A. to form CI.MAR Costruzioni Navali S.p.A. The joint venture is a shipyard based at Cimolai's facility alongside the Corno River, near San Giorgio di Nogaro. CIMAR builds the ship's hull which is subsequently towed to Genoa and outfitted by T. Mariotti.

In the 2010s the company further diversified into the offshore sector.

In 2019 Rete Ferroviaria Italiana placed an order with T. Mariotti for a rail ferry. The ship was named Iginia and was delivered in November 2021 to Bluferries. The ship is hybrid powered and is claimed to emit zero emissions in port.

In 2021 T. Mariotti began outfitting MV Seabourn Venture, the first luxury expedition ship that the yard had dealt with. The ship's hull was built by the CIMAR shipyard in San Giorgio di Nogaro. Seabourn Venture was delivered in June 2022.

Notable vessels

Yachts: 
 Persefoni I (built as Rahil)

References 

Shipbuilding companies of Italy